Alec K Redfearn is a musician and composer based in Providence, Rhode Island. He has composed music for dance, theater, and film. His primary instrument is the accordion. Most notable is his body of compositional work for The Eyesores, a genre-bending ensemble of unorthodox instrumentation which spawned in the mid-1990s and whose music spans old-time Americana, Appalachian, folk and Eastern European music.

He composed the soundtrack for, and had a small acting role in, the 2004 film, Stay Until Tomorrow, by Providence-based director, Laura Colella.  In 2005 he was awarded the MacColl Johnson Fellowship from the Rhode Island Foundation.

He has also developed a unique style of playing the accordion, introducing elements commonly associated with the guitar such as distortion, drone, and noise. He has performed on accordion and recorded in several ensembles of which he also composes for, such as Amoebic Ensemble, Barnacled, and Beat Circus.

Discography

Albums
Alec K. Redfearn and the Seizures
Exterminating Angel (Corleone Records, 2009)

Alec K. Redfearn and the Eyesores
The Eyesores (Self-released, 1998)
May You Dine on Weeds Made Bitter By the Piss of Drunkards (Magic Eye Singles, 1999)
Bent at the Waist  (Handsome Records, 2002)
Every Man For Himself and God Against All (Corleone Records, 2003)
The Quiet Room (Cuneiform Records, 2005)
The Smother Party (North East Indie Records , 2006)
The Blind Spot (Cuneiform Records, 2007)
Sister Death (Cuneiform Records, 2012)
The Opposite (Cuneiform Records, 2018)

Beat Circus
Ringleaders Revolt (Innova Records, 2004)
Dreamland (Cuneiform Records, 2008)

Barnacled
6 (Corleone Records, 2003)
Table 12 (7 inch single, White Denim Records, 2004)
Charles (ESP-Disk, 2008)

Amoebic Ensemble
Space Heater EP (QORQ Productions, 1991)
Amoebic Ensemble EP (QORQ Productions, 1993)
Driving Music EP (Simply Indefensible, 1994)
Road to World Domination (Simply Indefensible, 1995)
Limbic Rage (1995)
Radio Free Amoebica (Simply Indefensible, 1996)
Amoebiasis (Stupeur Et Trompette, 1998)

References
 
 

Year of birth missing (living people)
Living people
Cuneiform Records artists
American accordionists
Musicians from Providence, Rhode Island
21st-century accordionists
21st-century American male musicians